Lignyoptera is a genus of moths in the family Geometridae described by Julius Lederer in 1853.

Species
 Lignyoptera fumidaria (Hübner, 1825)
 Lignyoptera thaumastaria (Rebel, 1901)

References

Ennominae